Cannes-la-Bocca station (French: Gare de Cannes-la-Bocca)  is a railway station in the city of Cannes, southern France.

The station opened on 10 April 1863 when the line from Les Arcs to Cagnes-sur-Mer (part of the Marseille–Ventimiglia railway) opened to passengers. The station is both a passenger station and a goods/maintenance depot. Engine maintenance was transferred from Cannes-Ville in 1880 and the goods yard opened in 1883. The station is served by regional trains (TER Provence-Alpes-Côte d'Azur) to Cannes and Nice.

Cannes-La Bocca is situated alongside the beach and a connection to local ferries is possible.

See also
Cannes-Le Bosquet
Cannes-Ranguin
Cannes-Ville

References

Buildings and structures in Cannes
Cannes
Railway stations in Alpes-Maritimes
Railway stations in France opened in 1863